Pink Life QueerFest or Queer Fest is an international LGBT themed film festival held in various cities of Turkey. The Queer Fest, held in 2011 for the first time, is the first LGBT themed film festival of Turkey. The festival, held in Ankara until 2013, is started to organized in Denizli and Mersin beginning from 2014.

History
Pink Life QueerFest is started in 2011 by Pink Life LGBTİ+ Solidarity Association in Ankara. The festival had been held in Ankara until 2013. Beginning from 2014, the festival had been started to be organized also in İstanbul, Denizli and Mersin.

Prohibiton in Ankara
In 2017, The Governorship of Ankara announced the prohibition of all LGBTİ+ activities indefinitely, including Pink Life QueerFest in Ankara on the grounds that "some groups of people can react these events based their social sensitivities".

It is prohibited indefinitely by the Governorship of Ankara.

References

External links 

Film festivals in Turkey
LGBT events in Turkey
LGBT culture in Turkey
LGBT film festivals
Film festivals established in 2011
2011 establishments in Turkey
Annual events in Turkey